The 2017 Symetra Tour was a series of professional women's golf tournaments held from March through October 2017 in the United States. The Symetra Tour is the second-tier women's professional golf tour in the United States and is the "official developmental tour" of the LPGA Tour. It was previously known as the Futures Tour. In 2017, total prize money on the Symetra Tour was $2,950,000, down from $3,200,000 in 2016.

Schedule and results
The number in parentheses after winners' names show the player's total number of official money, individual event wins on the Symetra Tour including that event.

Source

Leading money winners
The top ten money winners at the end of the season gained fully exempt cards on the LPGA Tour for the 2018 season.

Source

Awards
Player of the Year, player who leads the money list at the end of the season
 Benyapa Niphatsophon
Gaëlle Truet Rookie of the Year Award, first year player with the highest finish on the official money list
 Hannah Green
Trainor Award, an individual or group that has made a significant contribution to women's golf.
 Potawatomi Nation tribes that support the Symetra Tour
Heather Wilbur Spirit Award, a Symmetry Tour player who "best exemplifies dedication, courage, perseverance, love of the game and spirit toward achieving goals as a professional golfer."
  Laura Wearn

See also
2017 LPGA Tour
2017 in golf

References

External links

Symetra Tour
Symetra Tour